Tabla is a percussion instrument from the Indian subcontinent. 

Tabla may also refer to:

Tabla!, an English language newspaper in Singapore
Tabla language, from Papua
Tabla Nani, Indian actor
Ballou Tabla (born 1999), Canadian footballer

See also
Tablas (disambiguation)
Tebela, an administrative centre of Humbo woreda in Wolaita Ethiopia